Aponte is an indigenous reserve in El Tablon de Gómez municipality. It is located in the northern part of the department of Nariño, in southern Colombia, with approximately 5000 inhabitants, and is a native of the Inga ethnic group from the Quechua. Its community has its own language and being an indigenous reserve, it has special rules imposed by its community, under the command of the indigenous governor and the indigenous guard.

History
According to historians, it is said that the first inhabitants came to this land at the beginning of the 16th century, from the department of Putumayo, exactly Valley Sibundoy valley, ruled by the Cacique Carlos Tamabioy, a native of Santiago Putumayo. They began the journey by a bridle path through the thick jungle that separates these two towns. To this day this path is still preserved, used by ancestors to communicate between the two sister communities.

Climate
The climate of Aponte Indigenous Reserve ranges from subtropical highland climate (Cfb) in the lower parts to subpolar oceanic climate (Cfc) and Tundra climate (ET) in the higher parts. The following climate data is for the central part of the reserve which has a borderline Tundra climate and subpolar oceanic climate.

References

Quechua
Colombia articles missing geocoordinate data
Indigenous reserves in Colombia